"Guitar Man" is a 1967 song written by Jerry Reed, who took his version of it to number 53 on the Billboard country music charts in 1967.

Soon after Reed's single appeared, Elvis Presley recorded the song with Reed playing the guitar part, and it became a minor country and pop hit.

Elvis Presley versions

According to Peter Guralnick in his two-volume biography of Presley, the singer had been trying unsuccessfully to record the tune, but wasn't happy with the groove.  He said something to the effect of: "Get me that redneck picker who's on the original tune", and his staff brought Reed into the studio - who nailed it on the first take (though this romantic account is contradicted by a studio tape of the session that documents the first, second and fifth takes which are available on video-sharing website youtube.com). The single spent one week at number one on the country chart.

Thirteen years later, "Guitar Man" was re-recorded in a new electric arrangement, with Presley's original vocal left intact, and it was the last of his eleven number-one country hits. The record also peaked at number twenty-eight on the Billboard Hot 100 and was his last top-40 pop hit in the U.S.

Personnel (Elvis Presley versions)

Credits sourced from Keith Flynn's research of RCA and AFM paperwork.

1967 version
 Elvis Presley – lead vocals
 Scotty Moore — rhythm guitar
 D. J. Fontana — drums
 Jerry Reed – acoustic lead guitars
 Chip Young – rhythm guitar
 Harold Bradley – rhythm guitar
 Charlie McCoy – rhythm guitar
 Floyd Cramer – piano
 Bob Moore – double bass
 Buddy Harman – drums

1981 version

Credits from Keith Flynn's research of RCA and AFM paperwork.

 Elvis Presley – lead vocals
 Jerry Reed – electric lead guitars
 Jerry Shook — guitar
 Larry Byrom — electric guitar
 Mike Leech — bass
 Jerry Carrigan — drums
 David Briggs — piano

Chart performance

Jerry Reed

Elvis Presley

References

Songs about musicians
1967 songs
1967 singles
1981 singles
Jerry Reed songs
Elvis Presley songs
Songs written by Jerry Reed